Niall Williams (Born June 8, 1958) in Dublin is an Irish writer. Having started as a non-fiction writer and playwright, he is most well-known as a novelist. His work has been translated into over twenty different languages.

Biography 
Williams was born in Dublin, Ireland in 1958. He attended Oatlands College, a boys’ school in Stillorgan, County Dublin. He studied English and French Literature at University College Dublin, where he met his wife, American writer and editor Christine Breen. He graduated with an Masters of Arts in Modern American literature in 1980. After a year lecturing at the Université de Caen in Normandy, he moved to New York. He worked briefly at Fox and Sutherland’s bookstore in Mount Kisco, New York, near his wife’s home town of Katonah before becoming a copywriter at Avon Books.

In 1985, Williams moved to Kilmihil, County Clare, in the west of Ireland. Here, he co-wrote four non-fiction books with Christine about their experiences of rural life in the cottage that her grandfather had left almost a century before.

Writing career

Non-fiction and drama 
His first four books were non-fiction chronicles of rural life in County Clare in the decade prior to the Celtic Tiger, co-written with Breen.

In 1991, Williams’ first play, The Murphy Initiative, was staged at the Abbey Theatre in Dublin. His second play, A Little Like Paradise, was produced on the Peacock stage of the Abbey Theatre in 1995. His third play, The Way You Look Tonight, was produced by Galway’s Druid Theatre Company in 1999.

Early novels 
Four Letters of Love, Williams' first novel, was published in 1997. It went on to become an international bestseller and has been published in over twenty countries.

As It Is In Heaven was published in 1999 and short-listed for the Irish Times Literature Prize.

The Fall of Light is Williams’ first foray into historical fiction. Set in the mid-nineteenth century, it chronicles the fate of the Foley family.

Only Say the Word was published in 2003 and is a contemporary novel dealing with the theme of loss.

Expanse into different styles 
In 2006, Williams’ novella, The Unrequited, was published as part of the Picador Shots series. Williams also wrote two young adult novels, Boy in the World, published in 2007, and Boy and Man, published in 2008. In 2008 Bloomsbury published John, Williams’.

Faha novels 
Since 2014, Williams has begun writing novels set in a fictional village in the west of Ireland called Faha. Similar to Macondo in the works of Gabriel García Márquez, Faha is a rural village steeped in magic realism which acts as a backdrop for Williams’ stories.

History of the Rain was published in 2014 and recounts the saga of a family from the perspective of Ruth Swain, a bed bound teenage girl. It was longlisted for the 2014 Booker Prize.

Williams’ ninth novel, This is Happiness, was published in September 2019. It tells the story of rural electrification and the changes to a small, isolated community, recounted from the perspective of Noe, a 78 year old man recalling his youth in the late 1950s.

Recognition

Four Letters of Love 

 Notable Book of the Year, The New York Times Book Review, 1997

As It Is In Heaven 

 Shortlisted for the International IMPAC Dublin Literary Award, 1999

The Fall of Light 

 Longlisted for the International IMPAC Dublin Literary Award, 2000

History of the Rain 

 Longlisted for the Man Booker Prize, 2014

This is Happiness 

 Washington Post Best Books of the Year, 2019
 Shortlisted for the An Post Irish Book Awards, Best Book of the Year, 2019

Novels
Four Letters Of Love (1997)
As It Is In Heaven (1999)
The Fall of Light (2001)
Only Say the Word (2005)
The Unrequited (2006)
Boy in the World (2007)
 Boy and Man (2008)

Personal life

Williams and Breen have two adult children, Deirdre and Joseph, and live in County Clare.

References

External links
 Official website

1958 births
Living people
Irish novelists
People educated at Oatlands College
Irish male novelists